Ugashik-Peulik is a volcanic complex in the U.S. state of Alaska, which includes the stratovolcano of Mount Peulik and the adjacent Ugashik caldera. It is located to the south of Becharof Lake in Lake and Peninsula Borough on the Alaska Peninsula. It is part of the Aleutian Range.

There are reports of eruptions at the complex in 1814 and 1852, but both are questionable.

References

 Alaska Volcano Observatory

External links
 Volcanoes of the Alaska Peninsula and Aleutian Islands-Selected Photographs

Volcanoes of Lake and Peninsula Borough, Alaska
Mountains of Lake and Peninsula Borough, Alaska
Stratovolcanoes of the United States
Mountains of Alaska
Volcanoes of Alaska
Aleutian Range
Calderas of Alaska
Pleistocene stratovolcanoes
Holocene stratovolcanoes
Pleistocene calderas
Holocene calderas